Pictou Centre is a provincial electoral district in Nova Scotia, Canada, that elects one member of the Nova Scotia House of Assembly.

Members of the Legislative Assembly
This riding has elected the following Members of the Legislative Assembly:

Election results

1949 general election

1953 general election

1956 general election

1960 general election

1963 general election

1967 general election

1970 general election

1974 general election

1978 general election

1981 general election

1984 general election

1988 general election

1993 general election

1998 general election

1999 general election

2003 general election

2006 general election

2009 general election

2013 general election 

|-
 
|Progressive Conservative
|Pat Dunn
|align="right"| 4,147
|align="right"| 52.26
|align="right"|
|-
 
|New Democratic Party
|Ross Landry
|align="right"| 2,373
|align="right"| 29.91
|align="right"|
|-
 
|Liberal
|Bill Muirhead
|align="right"| 1,415
|align="right"| 17.83
|align="right"|
|}

2017 general election

2021 general election

References

External links
 riding profile

New Glasgow, Nova Scotia
Nova Scotia provincial electoral districts